John Schmitz may refer to:

John G. Schmitz (1930–2001), American congressman
John P. Schmitz (born 1955), American government official and son of John G. Schmitz
John Michael Schmitz (born 1999), American football player
Johnny Schmitz (1920–2011), American baseball pitcher